Eling  is a station on Line 1 of Chongqing Rail Transit in Chongqing Municipality, China. It is located in Yuzhong District. It opened in 2011. This station is adjacent to Eling Park.

Station structure

References

Yuzhong District
Railway stations in China opened in 2011
Chongqing Rail Transit stations